Lac-à-la-Tortue Airport  is located  east of Lac-à-la-Tortue, Quebec, Canada.

The airport is classified as an airport of entry by Nav Canada and is staffed by the Canada Border Services Agency (CBSA). CBSA officers at this airport can handle general aviation aircraft only, with no more than 15 passengers.

See also
Lac-à-la-Tortue Water Aerodrome

References

Transport in Shawinigan
Registered aerodromes in Mauricie